Mario Gargiulo (born 26 March 1996) is an Italian footballer who plays for  club Pisa on loan from Modena as a midfielder.

Club career 
Gargiulo is a youth exponent from Brescia Calcio. He made his debut on 30 August 2014 against Frosinone Calcio in a Serie B game.

On 2 July 2019, he signed with Cittadella.

On 21 July 2022, Gargiulo signed a three-year contract with Modena. On 31 January 2023, he was loaned to Pisa, with an option to buy.

References

External links
 

1996 births
Footballers from Naples
Living people
Italian footballers
Association football midfielders
Brescia Calcio players
Bassano Virtus 55 S.T. players
S.S.D. Lucchese 1905 players
U.S. Città di Pontedera players
Imolese Calcio 1919 players
A.S. Cittadella players
U.S. Lecce players
Modena F.C. 2018 players
Pisa S.C. players
Serie B players
Serie C players